Zoran Ilic (born 1 September 1969) is an Australian soccer football manager and former player who played as a forward.

Career
He played as a striker in Australia with St George and Adelaide City in the National Soccer League winning 2 NSL titles and a NSL Cup. Between 1993 and 1995 he had a spell in Europe, with Serbian side FK Jagodina in FR Yugoslavia. He then played many years with Canterbury Marrickville in the National Premier Leagues NSW.

Representative career
He represented Australia at U-20 level at the qualifiers for the 1989 FIFA World Youth Championship and represented Australia U-23 in the qualifiers for the 1992 Summer Olympics.

References

1969 births
Living people
Australian soccer players
Association football defenders
St George FC players
Adelaide City FC players
Bankstown Berries FC players
FK Jagodina players
Expatriate footballers in Serbia and Montenegro
APIA Leichhardt FC players
Australian soccer coaches
Australian people of Serbian descent
Australia youth international soccer players
Australia under-20 international soccer players